Juan Alfredo César Müller (Buenos Aires, June 29, 1927 – São Paulo, July 1, 1990) was an Argentine psychologist and translator.

Biography 
He studied psychology at the C. G. Jung Institute in Zurich, Switzerland, and was a student of Leopold Szondi, with an application to the Regional Council of Psychology of São Paulo.

He settled in São Paulo in 1952 and gave, in 1979, the first university extension course in Astrology for graduates in Psychology at the Pontifical Catholic University of São Paulo, with the collaboration of Olavo de Carvalho.

Works 
Müller translated for Portuguese the book Introduction to the psychology of fate, by L. Szondi, which contains biographical data compiled by Pedro Balázs, both disciples of L. Szondi.

References 

Argentine psychologists
1927 births
1990 deaths
20th-century psychologists